Robert Morton (3 March 1906 – April 1990) was an English footballer who played for Ashington, Barnsley, Nottingham Forest, Newark Town, Bradford Park Avenue, and Port Vale in the 1920s and 1930s.

Career
Morton played for Tritlington, Ashington, Bedlington United, Barnsley, Nottingham Forest, Newark Town and Bradford Park Avenue, before joining Port Vale in May 1932. He scored ten goals in 33 Second Division appearances in the 1932–33 season, and found the net against West Ham United and Manchester United at The Old Recreation Ground. He scored five goals in 33 games in the 1933–34 campaign, with two of these goals coming in a 2–0 win over Preston North End on 10 March. He scored five goals in 36 league and FA Cup games in the 1934–35 season, before leaving the Football League to play for Throckley Welfare.

Career statistics
Source:

References

1906 births
1990 deaths
People from Widdrington, Northumberland
Footballers from Northumberland
English footballers
Association football wingers
Ashington A.F.C. players
Bedlington United A.F.C. players
Barnsley F.C. players
Nottingham Forest F.C. players
Newark Town F.C. players
Bradford (Park Avenue) A.F.C. players
Port Vale F.C. players
Throckley Welfare F.C. players
English Football League players
Date of death missing